The 2016 Africa Movie Academy Awards ceremony was held on Saturday 11 June 2016 at the Obi Wali International Conference Center in Port Harcourt, Rivers State. The ceremony recognized and honored excellence among directors, actors, and writers in the film industry. The awards night was hosted by Chris Attoh, Mike Ezuruonye and Kgopedi Lilokoe. It aired live on NTA to over 100 million viewers worldwide.

As part of the pre-AMAA activities, Rivers State Ministry of Culture and Tourism collaborated with the Africa Film Academy to host a sponsorship night to mobilize corporate sponsors for the awards. Other media partners included Africa Magic, OHTV, SABC and ONTV.

Nominees and winners
The nominees for the 12th Africa Movie Academy Awards ceremony were announced on 15 May 2016. The Cursed Ones led with 13 nominations while South African films Tell Me Sweet Something and Ayanda were tied with 9 nods each. Ghana had a total of 15 nominations with 5 films including The Cursed Ones, Rebecca, Cursed Treasure, Daggers of Life and The Peculiar Life of a Spider.

Winners were announced during the ceremony on 11 June 2016 at the Obi Wali International Conference Center. Eye of the Storm won in the categories Best Film, Achievement in Costume Design and Best Actor in a Supporting Role. Drama-thriller The Cursed Ones took home three awards on that same night, including awards for Best Director (Nana Obiri Yeboah), Achievement in Production Design, as well as Cinematography (Nicholas K. Lory).

Awards
Winners are listed first and highlighted in boldface.

Honorary awards

Lifetime Achievement
 Richard Mofe Damijo
 Joke Silva and Olu Jacobs
 Tony Akposhore

Multiple nominations and awards

The following films received multiple nominations:

 13 nominations: The Cursed Ones
 10 nominations: Eye of the Storm
 9 nominations: Tell Me Sweet Something and Ayanda
 6 nominations: Fifty
 5 nominations: Hear Me Move, Missing God, and A Soldier's Story
 4 nominations: Dry and Oshimiri
 3 nominations: O-Town

The following films received multiple awards:

 3 awards: Eye of the Storm and The Cursed Ones
 2 awards: Dry, Tell Me Sweet Something, and Soldier's Story

Dignitaries
Dignitaries present during the occasion were Governor of Rivers State Ezenwo Nyesom Wike, first lady Eberechi Wike, former Senate President David Mark, Minister of Information Lai Mohammed and veteran actor Pete Edochie.

References

2016 in Nigeria
2010s in Rivers State
21st century in Port Harcourt
Africa Movie Academy Awards ceremonies
Events in Port Harcourt
2016 film awards
2016 in Nigerian cinema

June 2016 events in Nigeria